Bagumbayan, officially the Municipality of Bagumbayan (Jawi: ايڠايد نو باڬومبيان), is a 1st class municipality in the province of Sultan Kudarat, Philippines. According to the 2020 census, it has a population of 68,947 people.

History
The municipality of Bagumbayan was transferred from Cotabato Province to Province of Sultan Kudarat on November 22, 1973, by presidential decree 341 by President Ferdinand E. Marcos.

Geography

Barangays
Bagumbayan is politically subdivided into 19 barangays.

Climate

Demographics

Economy

Known for its gold and copper deposits, Bagumbayan is Central Mindanao’s new source for export-quality banana and pineapple. Super Green Agricultural Developers Corp. (Sugadco) and SUMIFRU Inc. developed  of banana and pineapple plantations in Barangay Kinayao, Bagumbayan town, starting May, 2008. 5 other barangays in the town will later be developed for banana, namely: Bai Saripinang, Daguma, Kapaya, Tuka, Poblacion and Busok.

References

External links
 Bagumbayan Profile at PhilAtlas.com
 Bagumbayan Profile at the DTI Cities and Municipalities Competitive Index
 [ Philippine Standard Geographic Code]
 Philippine Census Information
 Local Governance Performance Management System

Municipalities of Sultan Kudarat